Pressec is a settlement in Guadeloupe in the commune of Anse-Bertrand, on the island of Grande-Terre.  Mahaudiere is to the west, La Berthaudiere to the north, and Massioux to the east.

Populated places in Guadeloupe